Sir Harpal Singh Kumar (born 1965) is a British medical researcher of Indian descent, who was the chief executive officer of Cancer Research UK until June 2018, when he left the charity to become Head of Johnson & Johnson Innovation EMEA.

Early life and education
Kumar's parents were refugees. As Sikhs, they chose to leave what was to become Pakistan and move to India during the Partition of India in 1947, where they ended up in refugee camps. Later they moved to England from India, where his father was employed sweeping factory floors, before eventually starting his own grocery store.

Kumar attended Latymer Upper School, Hammersmith, and St. John's College, Cambridge, where he gained a Master of Engineering degree and a Master of Arts degree and won the Mobil Prize, Metal Box Prize, and Hughes Prize. He subsequently gained a Master of Business Administration degree with High Distinction as a Baker Scholar at Harvard Business School where he won the Ford Prize and the Wolfe Prize.

Career
After graduation, Kumar was employed by McKinsey and Co. as a healthcare consultant. In 1992 he was appointed chief executive of the disability charity the Papworth Trust. In 1997 he founded Nexan Group, a venture capital-backed medical devices company. He joined Cancer Research Technology Limited as chief executive in 2002 and became chief operating officer of Cancer Research UK in 2004. He became chief executive officer in April 2007 and led the charity for more than a decade before departing for Johnson & Johnson Innovation. 

Among his other roles, Kumar is a trustee of the Francis Crick Institute and the Institute for Cancer Research, and chairman of the Board of the National Cancer Research Institute. He is also chairman of the Cancer Outcomes Strategy Advisory Group in England and co-chair of the National Awareness and Early Diagnosis Initiative, the senior Senior Independent Director of Innovate UK and a board member of UK Research and Innovation. 

On 10 April 2020 GRAIL Inc. announced Kumar's appointment as President of GRAIL Europe.

Awards and honours
Kumar was knighted in the 2016 New Year Honours for services to cancer research.

Personal life
Kumar is a British-Indian, a British-Punjabi and a British-Sikh.

Kumar lists his recreations as theatre, opera and football.

References

Living people
1965 births
English people of Indian descent
English people of Punjabi descent
English Sikhs
British people of Indian descent
British people of Punjabi descent
British Sikhs
Harvard Business School alumni
British chief executives
Alumni of St John's College, Cambridge
Knights Bachelor